Parliamentary elections were held in the Comoros on 6 December 2009, with a second round on 20 December. The elections were originally scheduled for July 2009, but were postponed until after a constitutional referendum was held in May 2009. They were then scheduled to take place on 29 November, but were delayed again. The result was a victory for the Baobab Movement, a coalition supporting President Ahmed Abdallah Mohamed Sambi.

Electoral system
The elections were held using the two-round system with 24 single-member constituencies. The remaining nine seats in the Assembly of the Union were filled by appointees from the assemblies of the autonomous islands of the Comoros, Grande Comore, Mohéli and Anjouan, with each island selecting three members.

Campaign
Most candidates supporting President Sambi campaigned as the Baobab coalition, named after their identifying symbol, the Baobab tree.

Results

References

Comoros
2009 in the Comoros
Elections in the Comoros
Election and referendum articles with incomplete results